Skyleader a.s. is a Chinese-owned aircraft manufacturer based in Jihlava, Czech Republic. The company specializes in the design and manufacture of ultralight aircraft in the form of ready-to-fly aircraft in the Fédération Aéronautique Internationale microlight and American light-sport aircraft categories.

History
The company was formed as a successor to the bankrupt Kappa 77, s.r.o., in March 2005 as Jihlavan Airplanes, s.r.o., named for the town in which it is located. Skyleader owns 100% of Jihlavan Airplanes and operates it as a subsidiary.

The company works with the Institute of Aerospace Engineering at Brno University of Technology on aircraft design, having jointly developed the Kappa 77 KP 2U-SOVA into the Skyleader 100 to 600 series of microlight and light-sport aircraft. The Skyleader GP One was developed as a new high-wing design and introduced at the AERO Friedrichshafen show in 2010. Skyleader also does aerospace manufacturing subcontract work and produced the doors for the Airbus A320 airliner.

The Bulgarian company ACS started producing the Skyleader 600 at the state owned TEREM-Letets aircraft factory in Sofia in July 2015 under a licence agreement. 

In 2017, Skyleader was purchased by the Chinese firm Zair Aerospace, which is headquartered in Wuhan. Zair set up a local production line in Hubei to manufacture the Zair JA600 that received Chinese state certification in 2019. The JA600 is a development of the Skyleader 600.

Aircraft

See also
Light aircraft manufacturers in the Czech Republic

References

External links

Aircraft manufacturers of the Czech Republic and Czechoslovakia
Czech brands
Ultralight aircraft
Homebuilt aircraft